William Pianu (born 7 December 1975) is an Italian footballer who plays as a defender for F.B.C. Unione Venezia.

Career
Pianu started his career at Juventus. He spent 7 seasons at Treviso.

After the bankrupt of Treviso, he was signed by Gallipoli along with team-mate Alessandro Moro  in August 2009. He left in summer 2010 his club U.S. Pergocrema 1932 to sign for Venezia.

Notes

Italian footballers
Juventus F.C. players
Rimini F.C. 1912 players
A.S. Cittadella players
Treviso F.B.C. 1993 players
U.S. Triestina Calcio 1918 players
S.S.C. Bari players
A.S.D. Gallipoli Football 1909 players
U.S. Pergolettese 1932 players
Association football defenders
Footballers from Turin
1975 births
Living people